was a district located in Aichi Prefecture, Japan.

As of 2003, the district had an estimated population of 31,684 and a density of 3,331.65 persons per km2. The total area was 9.51 km2.

Until March 31, 2005, the district had only the town Kisogawa.

On April 1, 2005, the town of Kisogawa, along with the city of Bisai, was merged into the expanded city of Ichinomiya. Haguri District was dissolved as a result of this merger.

Former districts of Aichi Prefecture